Gen.bryg. Edmund Stanisław Knoll-Kownacki (1891–1953) was a Polish military officer and a high-ranking commander of the Polish Army.

He died on September 2, 1953 and was buried at the Beaumaris cemetery in Llangefni, Wales. He was married to Janina Chramiec, and had a daughter, Maria Barbara.

Promotions
 Warrant officer – September 15, 1913
 Lieutenant – May 15, 1915
 Captain – November 1, 1916
 Major – October 13, 1918
 Colonel – June 1, 1919
 Brigadier-general – January 15, 1927

Honours and awards
 Silver Cross of the Order of Virtuti Militari (1921)
 Commander's Cross with Star of the Order of Polonia Restituta, previously awarded the Commander's Cross and the Officer's Cross
 Cross of Independence
 Cross of Valour (six times)
 Gold Cross of Merit
 Commemorative Medal for War 1918-1921
 10 Years of Independence medal
 Military Merit Medal (Austria-Hungary)
 Commander of the Legion of Honour
 Order of the Crown of Romania, 2nd class

1891 births
1953 deaths
People from Nowy Dwór Mazowiecki County
Polish generals
Polish Rifle Squads members
Polish people of World War I
Polish military personnel of World War II
Polish people of the Polish–Soviet War
World War II prisoners of war held by Germany
Polish prisoners of war
Moscow State University alumni
Commandeurs of the Légion d'honneur
Recipients of the Silver Cross of the Virtuti Militari
Recipients of the Cross of Independence
Commanders with Star of the Order of Polonia Restituta
Recipients of the Cross of Valour (Poland)
Recipients of the Gold Cross of Merit (Poland)
Grand Officers of the Order of the Crown (Romania)
Polish emigrants to the United Kingdom